Webb is a given name. Notable people with the name include:

Webb C. Ball (1848–1922), American jeweler and watchmaker
Webb Franklin (born 1941), US Representative from Mississippi
Webb Gillman (1870–1933), Irish General
Webb Hayes (1856–1923), American businessman and soldier
Webb Miller (born 1943), American professor
Webb Miller (journalist) (1891–1940), American war correspondent
Webb Pierce (1921–1991), American country music singer
Webb D. Sawyer (1918–1995), American Marine general, Navy Cross recipient
Webb Seymour, 10th Duke of Somerset (1718–1793)
Webb Simpson (born 1985), American golfer
Webb Schultz (1898–1986), American baseball pitcher
Webb Wilder (born 1954), American rock singer